Ghanshyam Sarda (born August 1959 in Calcutta, India) is a Calcutta-based businessman and owner of the Sarda Group of Industries, which operates mainly in the jute and information technology industries. Alwar Jute Mill, Agarpara Jute Mill, Axsys Technologies, Vision Comptech are all owned by the Sarda Group. He also has a charitable trust known as Chandakala Devi Trust.

Businesses
The Sarda Group of Industries is scattered all over West Bengal and is headquartered in Kolkata.  The group currently has eight jute mills that together produce more than 500 tons of jute products daily. The recently set up Jute Mill at Alwar, Rajasthan has an estimated investment of Rs 100 crore.

The Sarda Group was also the first business organization in India to set up professional training facilities for people working in jute mills. To date, Sarda group employs over 50,000 people and is one of West Bengal's largest employers. Apart from the field of business, Mr. Sarda had also contributed to the state in various forms of events, sports and public affairs. Sarda also been honoured for his work by many eminent personalities of the state.

Expansion strategy
The Sarda Group has expanded its business to form a Pan-India presence in the field of jute goods manufacturing. The Group has acquired the JK Jute Mills in Kanpur. This unit has brought the production unit closer to the consumer. The mill produces jute bags in bulk order to sugar mills in Uttar Pradesh. Sarda has been a proponent of initialising refinement of the skills of the factory workers. He stressed that with the development of skills, the industry would meet the demands for eco-friendly products out of natural fibre. Recently, Sarda Group of Industries had started a venture to help Jute labourers to take care of their own health for their benefit.

Following the acquisition of the Kanpur mill, which has a capacity of 120 tonnes per day (TPD), the Sarda group's jute goods manufacturing capacity now stands at 560 tonnes per day. Apart from seven jute mills in Bengal, the group has set up plants in Bihar, Orissa and Andhra Pradesh. The group is setting up a mill in Rajasthan and is also planning a unit in Tamil Nadu.

Investments
The Sarda Group acquired a 4% stake in GIC Housing, calling it a long-term investment. Ghanshyam Sarda said "The global trend show a great future for the housing finance companies". The investor friendly approach of the new West Bengal government led by Buddhadeb Bhattacharjee has acted a stimulant to the companies willing to set up shops and development centres in Bengal.

References

External links
 Ghanshyam Sarda Official News
 alwarjutemill.com
 Chandrakala Devi Sarda Charitable Trust

Rajasthani people
1959 births
Living people
Businesspeople from Kolkata